Xikang (also Sikang or Hsikang) was a nominal province
formed by the Republic of China in 1939 on the initiative of prominent Sichuan warlord Liu Wenhui and continued by the early People's Republic of China. Thei idea was to form a single unified province for the entire Kham region under direct Chinese administration, in effect annexing the western Kham region that was then under Tibetan control. Kham was entirely populated by Tibetan people called Khampas. The then independent Tibet controlled the portion of Kham west of the Upper Yangtze River.
The nominal Xikang province also included in the south the Assam Himalayan region (Arunachal Pradesh) that Tibet had recognised as a part of British India by the 1914 McMahon Line agreement.
The eastern part of the province was inhabited by a number of different ethnic groups, such as Han Chinese, Yi, Qiang people and Tibetan, then known as Chuanbian, a special administrative region of the Republic of China. In 1939, it became the new Xikang province with the additional territories belonging to Tibetan and British control added in. After the People's Republic of China invaded and occupied Tibet, the earlier nationalist imagination of Xikang came to fruition.

The provincial capital of Xikang was Kangding from 1939 to 1951 and Ya'an from 1951 to 1955. The province had a population of 3.4 million in 1954.

History 

In 1910, general Zhao Erfang occupied Kham region, destroyed a few monasteries and killed over 1000 lamas. Later on, he proclaimed this territory as a new Chinese province subsequently known as Xikang.

Following the Wuchang Uprising in October 1911 which led to the downfall of the Qing dynasty, this region was established as the Chuanbian Special Administrative District by the newly founded Republic of China.

In June 1930 this region was invaded by the army of Tibet, precipitating the Sino-Tibetan War. With the district locked in internal struggles, no reinforcements were sent to support the Sichuanese troops stationed here. As a result, the Tibetan army captured, without encountering much resistance, Garze and Xinlong Counties. When a negotiated ceasefire failed, Tibetan forces expanded the war attempting to capture parts of southern Qinghai province. In March 1932 their force invaded Qinghai but was defeated by the local Hui warlord Ma Bufang in July, routing the Tibetan army and driving it back to this district.

The Hui army captured counties that had fallen into the hands of the Tibetan army since 1919. Their victories threatened the supply lines to the Tibetan forces in Garze and Xinlong. As a result, part of the Tibetan army was forced to withdraw.

In 1932 Liu Wenhui in cooperation with the Qinghai army, sent out a brigade to attack the Tibetan troops in Garze and Xinlong, eventually occupying them, Dêgê and other counties east of the Jinshajiang River. The 1934 Khamba Rebellion led by the Pandatsang family broke out against the Tibetan government in Lhasa. The Khampa revolutionary leader Pandatsang Rapga was involved.

In January 1939, the Chuanbian Special Administrative District officially became a province of the Republic, the Hsikang Province. Kesang Tsering was sent by the Chinese to Batang to take control of Sikang, where he formed a local government. He was sent there for the purpose of propagating the Three Principles of the People to the Khampa.

In 1950, following the defeat of the Kuomintang by the Chinese Communist Party in the Chinese Civil War, Xikang was split along the Yangtze into Sikang to the east and a separate Chamdo Territory to the west. Chamdo was merged into Tibet Autonomous Region in 1965. The rest of Hsikang was merged into Sichuan in 1955.

Administrative divisions

1939-1950

1950–1955

List of governors

Chairperson of the Provincial Government

Xikang CPC Party Committee Secretary

Xikang People's Government Chairperson (Governor after January 1955)

See also
 
Kham

References

Bibliography
 
 

1939 establishments in Tibet
Provinces of the Republic of China (1912–1949)
Former provinces of China
Tibet
1950 disestablishments in China